DXFL (88.9 FM) First Love Radio is a radio station owned and operated by First Love Broadcasting Network. The studio's studio is located along Jose P. Rizal Ave. cor. Arellano St., Dipolog, while its transmitter is located at Above Sea Level, Brgy. Gulayao, Dipolog.

Incidents and controversies
On the early morning of May 31, 2013, gunshots were fired piercing the announcer's booth of the station. No one was hurt or killed at that time.
Nick Carbonel, a well-known radio personality in DXFL, was sued by Congressman Rosendo Labadlabad for libel in 2017. Claims on misinformation alleging the representative at the time were unclear.

References

External links
First Love Radio Dipolog FB Page

Radio stations in Zamboanga del Norte
Radio stations established in 1993